Catherine Marcelle Reitman (born April 28, 1981) is a Canadian-American actress, producer, and writer. She is the creator, executive producer, writer, and star of the CBC comedy series Workin' Moms.

Early life
Reitman was born in Los Angeles, California, the daughter of French-Canadian actress Geneviève Robert and Slovak-born Canadian film director Ivan Reitman. Her father was from a Jewish family and her mother converted to Judaism. She attended the Cate School and majored in acting at University of Southern California. She is the sister of Caroline Reitman and director Jason Reitman.

Career
In January 2011, Reitman launched Breakin' It Down with Catherine Reitman, a film review web show on YouTube, which ended in July 2013. She occasionally filled in for Kevin Smith as a guest co-host with Ralph Garman on their podcast, Hollywood Babble-On.

Reitman starred in the television series The Real Wedding Crashers, based on the hit movie Wedding Crashers. She appeared in the films Beethoven's 2nd (1993), Knocked Up (2007), I Love You, Man (2009) and Friends with Benefits (2011). She has also had roles on the series Hollywood Residential, It's Always Sunny in Philadelphia, How I Met Your Mother, Weeds, and Blackish. In 2022, she appeared in the revival of the sketch comedy series The Kids in the Hall.

In 2016, Reitman formed Wolf & Rabbit Entertainment ULC. with her husband Philip Sternberg to produce the half-hour, single-camera comedy Workin' Moms for CBC. She is the creator, executive producer, writer and star of the series, starring alongside Sternberg. In addition, Reitman has directed several episodes in each of the series’ seasons. Workin' Moms received five Canadian Screen Award nominations in 2017 including Best Actress, Comedy, for Reitman, and Best Series, Comedy.

Personal life
She is married to actor and producer Philip Sternberg, and they have two children.

References

External links 
 
 Breakin’ It Down with Catherine Reitman on Catherine Reitman's YouTube channel

1981 births
Living people
20th-century American actresses
21st-century American actresses
20th-century Canadian actresses
21st-century Canadian actresses
Actresses from Los Angeles
American child actresses
American film actresses
Canadian child actresses
Canadian film actresses
American people of French-Canadian descent
American people of Slovak-Jewish descent
Canadian people of Slovak-Jewish descent
American television actresses
American voice actresses
Canadian television actresses
Canadian voice actresses
Jewish American actresses
Jewish Canadian actresses
20th-century American Jews
Canadian Jews
Reitman family
People of French-Canadian descent
USC School of Dramatic Arts alumni
21st-century American Jews
Canadian television directors
Canadian women television directors